HarborView Condominium is a residential high-rise in Baltimore, Maryland, United States. Originally approved in 1990, the structure was completed in 1993 and was built on the site of the old Bethlehem Steel Shipyards graving dock which was demolished in 1983. HarborView Condominium was designed by architectural firms Design Collective, Inc. and SHK3 Architectural Interdesign.

The HarborView complex was originally planned to include two additional 26-story residential towers. However, as the complex is located on the Inner Harbor waterfront, the plan received much criticism for its potential to block views of the harbor. The proposal for the two additional towers was eventually blocked by Baltimore Mayor Sheila Dixon in August 2007. However, the structures were then redesigned, and a new proposal for a 17-story Pinnacle at HarborView has received construction approval from the city. A redesign of the third building in the complex, HarborView Phase 3, has yet to receive city approval. In 2020, the property was listed with a value of $6,000,000.

See also
 List of tallest buildings in Baltimore

References

Inner Harbor, Baltimore
Residential skyscrapers in Baltimore
Residential condominiums in the United States
Residential buildings completed in 1993